Like much of art history, Graffiti has historically been considered a male dominated art form. Women have contributed to graffiti since its inception, with theories that early cave wall art was primarily drawn by women. The first female contemporary graffiti artists are popularly understood to be Eva 62 and Barbara 62, followed by Lady Pink, who began painting New York City subway trains as early as 1979. Notable examples of female graffiti artists include Claw Money, Lady Pink, ShenShen210, Swoon, Shamsia Hassani, and Miss Van.

Feminism in Graffiti
Once Lady Pink's work began appearing in art exhibits, her art became focused on feminist issues. Miss Van's artwork is female based contemporary art to highlight women who aren't represented in graffiti art. Another artist whose work is heavily invested in feminist ideas is Tatyana Fazlalizadeh. Tatyana is the creator of the art campaign 'Stop Telling Women to Smile' which purpose is to create posters along with different phrases women have heard in their lives while public. These phrases include 'My worth extends beyond my body' and 'I am not here for you'. This type of social justice artwork can be found in other countries as well. A duo in the Honduras who call themselves the 'doll clan' write graffiti to promote reproductive rights for women and to speak out against sexual assault on women. A lot of their work focuses on the fact that emergency contraceptives are banned in the Honduras where sexual violence against women is rampant. According to Graff, "being a woman graffiti artist is a blow to a system permeated by machismo." The projects that female graffiti artists create are also for personal reasons that includes experience by themselves or other people close to them.

Representation in Graffiti Art 
Female representation within graffiti art subculture was minimal during the beginnings of graffiti art. Only a few were given a platform for their art. Lady Pink is one of these few. Her beginnings started with following boys to tag trains and walls. Fabara became internationally recognized for her revolutionary artwork. Her work can be seen in exhibits in London and the Netherlands. Graffiti artist Shamsia Hassani whose work is invited in many countries, faced obstacles showcasing her artwork in Afghanistan. Her artwork is representative of the discrimination women face as second class citizens in Afghan. Her signature graffiti art displays a woman wearing a hijab who has her eyes closed and no mouth. The closed eyes is due to the violence against not just women but around the country that is unbearable to watch and the lack of mouth is because of the silenced women who are unable to speak against it. She often faces criticism from the more traditional people who still hold beliefs that set boundaries for women. Because of the hostile environment, Hassani is exposed to being attacked or harassed. Representation of women within the art itself is more apparent in the art of female graffiti artists. Art like Miss Van's re-imagine the female body with unusual proportions of the eyes and nudity is active in the majority of her artwork. Lady Pink prefers to spray women because she finds women more interesting.

Activism in Female Graffiti Communities
Female graffiti artists like Lady Pink started groups like Ladies of the Arts, whose purpose is to highlight and educate growing female graffiti artists. Another graffiti group is the Doll Clan. The group is political in nature and art exposes social justice issues in their home country. Female graffiti artists in locations such as Chile and Brazil are forming all-female crews where new female artists are given a positive space with support, mentoring and friendship. These communities feel that by re-claiming space through graffiti they are "[protesting] her invisibility" and "[claiming] space in a subculture where the walls 'belong' to men". Not only do the art communities address issues around women, but they also touch on issues like gay-bashing and racism.

Notable artists
 Lady Pink (USA, New York)
 ShenShen210 (USA, California)
 Tatyana Fazlalizadeh (USA)
 Shamsia Hassani (Afghanistan)
 Christina Angelina / Starfighter (USA, California)
 Stephanie Rond (USA, Ohio)
 Miss Van (France, Toulouse)
 
  (France)
 Sand One (USA, LA-based)
 Lady Aiko (USA, NY-based)
 MUSA 71 (Spain, Barcelona)
Margaret Kilgallen (USA, San Francisco)
Claw Money (USA, New York)

References

External links

 Women Street Artists
 
 
 
 Girl Power (February 27, 2016) iMdb - The First Women's Graffiti And Street Art Documentary
 
 

Graffiti and unauthorised signage